Miloslav Mečíř was the defending champion, but lost in the final to Henri Leconte. The score was 6–2, 5–7, 6–4, 6–2. Leconte became the last French player to win the tournament until Gilles Simon won it in 2011.

Seeds
The first eight seeds received a bye to the second round.

Draw

Finals

Top half

Section 1

Section 2

Bottom half

Section 3

Section 4

References

External links
 Official results archive (ATP)
 Official results archive (ITF)

German Open - Singles